Antonio Luis Ferré (born February 6, 1934) is the Chairman of the Board of the Ferré-Rangel business emporium which owns Puerto Rico's largest newspaper, El Nuevo Día, as well as Primera Hora newspaper.

Ferré is the son of former Governor of Puerto Rico, Don Luis A. Ferré, and Lorenza Ramírez de Arellano. His sister was writer and essayist Rosario Ferré.

Ferré served as member of the Puerto Rico Civil Rights Commission in the 1960s, and managed his father's political campaigns.  From 1965 to 1966 he was president of the Puerto Rico Manufacturers Association.

Semi-retired, Ferré and his wife, Luisa Rangel, have delegated to their sons and daughters the day-to-day operations of his businesses and non-profit entities, including the Ponce Museum of Art and the Ferré Foundation created by his father.

References

Puerto Rican people of Catalan descent
Living people
Industrialists from Ponce
1934 births